Friday Night Lights may refer to:

 Friday Night Lights: A Town, a Team, and a Dream, a 1990 non-fiction book by H. G. Bissinger
 Friday Night Lights (film), a 2004 film based on the book
 Friday Night Lights (film soundtrack), the soundtrack of the 2004 film
 Friday Night Lights (TV series), a 2006 TV series based on the book and film
 Friday Night Lights (television soundtrack)
 Friday Night Lights Vol. 2 (television soundtrack)
 Friday Night Lights (Attic Lights album), an album by Attic Lights
 Friday Night Lights (mixtape), a mixtape by J. Cole

See also
 Friday Night (disambiguation)